Spaniards in Paris is a 1971 Spanish drama film directed by Roberto Bodegas. It was entered into the 7th Moscow International Film Festival.

Cast
 Laura Valenzuela as Emilia
 Ana Belén as Isabel
 Máximo Valverde as Manolo
 Tina Sáinz as Francisca
 Elena María Tejeiro as Dioni
 José Sacristán as Plácido
 Emma Cohen as Katy
 Simón Andreu as Director of Pompe Service
 Pierre Vernier as Monsieur Lemonier
 Françoise Arnoul as Madame Lemonier
 Teresa Rabal as Casilda
 Yelena Samarina as Madame Legrand

References

External links
 

1971 films
1971 drama films
Spanish drama films
1970s Spanish-language films
Films about immigration to France
1970s Spanish films